Dori is a department or commune of Séno Province in northern Burkina Faso. Its capital is the town of Dori.

Towns and villages
 Kampiti
 Oulo

References

Departments of Burkina Faso
Séno Province